Cristian Ciprian Lupuț (born 2 September 1977) is a Romanian former professional footballer and currently a manager. As a footballer, Lupuț played for teams such as: Olimpia Satu Mare, Ceahlăul Piatra Neamț, Bihor Oradea, Petrolul Ploiești or Târgu Mureș, among others. After retirement, he started to work as a football manager and since 2014 coached CS Mădăras, Luceafărul Oradea and Viitorul Târgu Jiu.

References

External links
 
 

1977 births
Living people
Sportspeople from Oradea
Romanian footballers
Association football defenders
Liga I players
Liga II players
FC Olimpia Satu Mare players
FC Progresul București players
FC Unirea Dej players
CSM Ceahlăul Piatra Neamț players
FC Bihor Oradea players
FC Petrolul Ploiești players
CS Concordia Chiajna players
ASA 2013 Târgu Mureș players
CS Luceafărul Oradea players
Romanian football managers
CS Luceafărul Oradea managers
ACS Viitorul Târgu Jiu managers
CS Aerostar Bacău managers